Ernest Edmunds (11 August 1846 – 8 September 1920) was a New Zealand cricketer. He played in two first-class matches for Wellington from 1875 to 1877.

See also
 List of Wellington representative cricketers

References

External links
 

1846 births
1920 deaths
New Zealand cricketers
Wellington cricketers
Sportspeople from Worthing